St. Magnus may refer to:

People
Magnus of Anagni, 2nd-century bishop and martyr in Anagni, Italy
Magnus of Cuneo, 3rd-century martyr 
Magnus Erlendsson, Earl of Orkney (1075–1116/7), martyred saint in Orkney, now in Scotland
Magnus of Füssen (probably 7th or 8th century), missionary saint in Allgäu, now in Germany
Magnus of Avignon (died 660),  Gallo-Roman saint, bishop and governor of Avignon, now in France
Magnus of Oderzo (died 670), Italian saint, founder of eight churches in Venice
Magnus (bishop of Milan) (active 518 - )

Other
 St. Magnus, suburb of Bremen, Germany
 St Magnus-the-Martyr, a Church of England church and parish within the City of London

See also
Albert of Cologne, St. Albertus Magnus, patron saint of medical technicians; those in the natural sciences; philosophers; scientists